Florence Short (May 19, 1893 – July 10, 1946) was an American actress. She had numerous film roles as a supporting actress and was also cast in theatrical productions.

She was born in Springfield, Massachusetts, and moved with her family to New York City as a child, where she attended the Finch School for Girls.  She made her professional stage debut in 1910 with the Avenue Stock Company of Wilmington, Delaware. She had early Braodway appearances in Thompson Buchanan's The Bridal Path and George V. Hobart's Experience, and early film roles in  Damaged Goods (1914) and The Law That Failed (1917).

She died at her home in Hollywood and is buried in Los Angeles.

Filmography
 Damaged Goods (1914), as Nurse
 Destiny: Or, The Soul of a Woman (1915), as Passion
The Law That Failed (1917)
 The Outsider (1917), as Mrs. Standish
 The Golden God (1917)
 A Man's World (1918), as Lione Brune
 Pay Day (1918)
 The Eagle's Eye (1918), as Madame Augusta
 Kildare of Storm (1918), as Mahaly
 Five Thousand an Hour (1918), as Polly Parsons
 The Great Victory (1919), as Elaine
 The Love Flower (1920), as Mrs. Bevan
 The Idol Dancer (1920), as Pansy
 Silver Wings (1921), as Widow Martin
 Lessons of Love (1921)
 Woman's Place (1922), as Amy Bleeker
 Cardigan (1922), as Molly Brandt from the Revolutionary War era
 Does It Pay? (1923), as Martha Weston
 The Enchanted Cottage (1924), as Ethel

References

External links 

 
 
 

1893 births
1946 deaths
20th-century American actresses
American film actresses
American silent film actresses
Actresses from Massachusetts